R411 road may refer to:

 R411 road (Ireland)
 R411 road (South Africa)